Re Hallett’s Estate (1880) 13 Ch D 696 is an English trusts law case, concerning asset tracing.

Facts
Mr Hallett, a solicitor, held bonds for Mrs Cotterill worth £2145 until he wrongfully sold them and put the proceeds in his current bank account, with Winning’s Bank, mixed with his own money. When he died the account had £3000.

Judgment

High Court
Fry J was concerned with whether Mr Hallett had a fiduciary relation, given he held as a bailee, and not a trust, strictly speaking. He held the first in first out rule applied, following Pennell v Deffell (1853) 4 De GM&G 372, so that a large proportion of Mrs Cotterrill’s money was in fact already paid out.

Court of Appeal

Lord Jessel MR held that there was a fiduciary relationship, and the proceeds of the sale of the bonds could be traced. It then went back to determine how much could be traced. A trustee cannot say trust money is merely lost. He reversed Fry J and held that the claimants were entitled to an equitable charge of £2,145 over the fund. There was a presumption that a fiduciary is acting honestly and therefore intends not to dissipate the beneficiary’s money rather than his own.

Baggallay LJ concurred.

Thesiger LJ dissented, arguing they were bound by Pennell v Deffell.

The Court also held that in the case of a mixture of trust funds with the trustee's own money, only an equitable lien would be available as a remedy. This has since been overruled by Foskett v McKeown [2001] 1 AC 102, where the House of Lords held that the beneficiary has the option of choosing an equitable lien or a constructive trust in the case of a mixed fund. A constructive trust would allow a claim in the new asset in proportion to the contribution of the beneficiary's trust fund.

See also

English trusts law
Foskett v McKeown

Notes

References

English trusts case law
Court of Appeal (England and Wales) cases
1880 in British law
1880 in case law